Alberto Sgarbi (born 26 November 1986 in Montebelluna) is an Italian rugby union former player who played at Centre for  the Italian national team. He represented italy on 29 occasions with 2 tries.

Benetton Rugby
Sgarbi joined Benetton Treviso in the 2006–07 season, with a few appearances in the Super 10 Italian Premiership and the Heineken Cup.

In the 2007–08 season Sgarbi has been highlighted in the match against Amatori Catania, in which he scored 4 personal tries and was elected "Man of the Match". At the end of the season will be 7 individual tries scored.

The 2009–10 season was the maturation of the player, with the capture of three titles (Super 10 Italian Premiership, Italian Cup and Italian Super Cup), 5 tries and best individual performance in the Heineken Cup, where he played every match in the XV holder.

On 4 September 2010 he debuted in the then-Celtic League with Benetton Treviso in the historic 34-28 victory against Scarlets of Wales. He played with Benetton until 2020–21 Pro14 season.

In 2021−2022 season he played for Petrarca Padova in the ItalianTop10.

Italy
After being launched in the National youth teams, Sgarbi was part of the Italy "A" in the IRB Nations Cup 2007 and was called in Italy to prepare the World Cup in France in 2007.

He was called up to the Italy squad for the 2008 Six Nations Championship and he get his first Italian International cap against England on 10 February 2008.

He participated in the 2010 IRB Nations Cup with Italy and scoring his first points for an Italy team, thanks to a try during the final match of the event against Romania.

He returned with the Italy squad at the end of July 2010 and in autumn 2010, thanks to excellent start to the season in the Celtic League, Sgarbi was used by Nick Mallett from the first minute in the two Test Matches against Australia and Fiji.

At the 2011 Six Nations Championship he was deployed from the first minute in the opening match against Ireland. 
On 21 August 2011, he was named in the final 31-man squad for the 2011 Rugby World Cup.

References

External links
 Alberto Sgarbi profile, from BenettonRugby.it
 Alberto Sgarbi Magners League club statistics, from MagnersLeague.com
RBS 6 Nations profile
It's Rugby England Profile

1986 births
Living people
People from Montebelluna
Benetton Rugby players
Italian rugby union players
Italy international rugby union players
Rugby union centres
Rugby union flankers
Mogliano Rugby players
Petrarca Rugby players
Sportspeople from the Province of Treviso